Diaz Kambere is a Ugandan-born Canadian footballer. He currently plays for Africa United FC in the Multicultural Soccer League of British Columbia.  He serves as the senior girls coach at Delview Secondary

Career

College and Amateur
Kambere was born in Uganda, but moved to Surrey, British Columbia with his family as a child. He was a student at Centennial Secondary School in Coquitlam and John Norquay Elementary School in Vancouver, played youth soccer for Vancouver's Italian Canadian Sports Federation (ICSF) and the Eagle Ridge Rogue Selects in Coquitlam, BC, and was also a member of the British Columbia provincial team at the U-15, U-16, and U-18 levels. After moving with his family to the Lower Mainland in 1992 he attended Langara College and then  Trinity Western University, where he studied Human Kinetics and Psychology.

Professional
Kambere signed for the Vancouver Whitecaps of the USL First Division in 2006, subsequently playing in 28 games over two years with the team. On September 6, 2008, he was signed to a 'one day contract' with Toronto FC to be able to play in a game against Chivas USA, due to that squad missing nine players to international duty.

On December 10, 2008, Kambere was released from his contract with the Whitecaps. Having been unable to secure a professional contract, he signed with the Abbotsford Mariners of the USL Premier Development League for the 2009 season.

After a brief loan spell with Surrey United in the Pacific Coast Soccer League, Kambere joined Abbotsford's PDL rivals Victoria Highlanders in 2010.

International
Kambere represented Canada in the 2008 CONCACAF Olympic Qualifying tournament.

Personal life
Before moving to Canada Kambere's father, Amos Kambere, served as a member of the Ugandan Parliament. His older brother, Donald Kambere, played alongside him at Abbotsford, and he has two younger brothers, Jethro and Kule.

Coaching career
He has coached soccer for the Vancouver Whitecaps Academy, Perform All Out, SFC Pegasus, LFUSA, and CCB Men’s Premier Club who won the men’s 2019 Provincials and Nationals. Diaz also coaches soccer at Delview Secondary School where he works as a child and youth care worker.

Honours

Vancouver Whitecaps
USL First Division championship (1): 2008

References

1985 births
Living people
Fraser Valley Mariners players
Black Canadian soccer players
Soccer people from British Columbia
Canadian soccer coaches
Canadian soccer players
Association football defenders
Major League Soccer players
Naturalized citizens of Canada
People from Kasese District
Sportspeople from Surrey, British Columbia
Toronto FC players
Canadian people of Ugandan descent
Ugandan footballers
Ugandan emigrants to Canada
USL League Two players
USL First Division players
Vancouver Whitecaps (1986–2010) players
Victoria Highlanders players
Canada men's under-23 international soccer players
Langara College people